The Scottish Mixed Doubles Curling Championship is the national curling championship for mixed doubles in Scotland. The Championship has been held annually since 2007 and the winners proceed to represent Scotland at the World Mixed Doubles Curling Championship.

The 2019 champions were Gina Aitken and Scott Andrews, who went through the 12-team 2018 Championships undefeated with Duncan Menzies filling in for an injured Andrews. At the 2019 World Mixed Doubles Championship they finished the round robin with a 6-1 record before losing in the first round of the playoffs to Estonia.

The 2020 Mixed Doubles Championship was held 27 February - 1 March, 2020 at the Dewars Centre in Perth.

In 2022, Eve Muirhead and Bobby Lammie went undefeated through the entire championship, beating Jennifer Dodds and Bruce Mouat in the final 9-2 after 5 ends.

Past champions 
Champions and runners-up since the championship was started in 2007:

References

See also
Scottish Men's Curling Championship
Scottish Women's Curling Championship
Scottish Mixed Curling Championship
Scottish Junior Curling Championships
Scottish Senior Curling Championships
Scottish Schools Curling Championship
Scottish Wheelchair Curling Championship

Curling competitions in Scotland
Recurring sporting events established in 2007
Annual sporting events in the United Kingdom
Annual events in Scotland
National curling championships
Mixed doubles curling